A clique is a close social group.

Clique or The Clique may also refer to:

Math and computing
 Clique (graph theory)
 Clique problem in computer science

Business and brands
 Clique (vodka), a Latvian vodka sold in the United States

Entertainment and the arts
 Clique (TV series), an online serial on BBC Three
 The Clique (art group), a group of Victorian artists
 St John's Wood Clique a later group of Victorian artists
 The Clique (series) by Lisi Harrison
 The Clique (novel), a novel in the series
 The Clique (film), based on the series

 Music groups
 The Clique (American band), a late 1960s U.S. sunshine pop band from Houston
 The Clique (British band), a 1990s mod band
 Skeleton Clique, or the Clique, the fan base of American musical duo Twenty One Pilots
 The Clique (duo), an Australian pop duo
 Cliques, the piccolo and marching drum bands at the Carnival of Basel
 Destinee & Paris, a girl group formerly known as Clique Girlz
 HaClique, a 1980s Israeli rock band from Tel-Aviv
 The Wrecking Crew was sometimes referred to as "The Clique"
 The Cliques, a 1950s American R&B vocal duo of Jesse Belvin and Eugene Church

 Songs
"Clique", a 1974 single by Con Funk Shun
"Clique" (song), a 2012 song by rappers Kanye West, Jay-Z and Big Sean

Other
 Clique (professional wrestling), a famous 1990s group of professional wrestlers
 Château Clique, a group of wealthy families in Lower Canada in the early 19th century
 Ruling clique in politics (especially in the history of China)

See also
 Claque
 Click (disambiguation)